Nova Pazova is a settlement in Serbia. It is situated in the Stara Pazova municipality, in the region of Syrmia (Syrmia District), in the autonomous province of Vojvodina. The settlement's population is currently 17,105 (2011 census).

Name
In Serbian, the settlement is known as Nova Pazova (Нова Пазова), in German as Neu-Pasua, in Croatian as Nova Pazova, and in Hungarian as Újpazova.

History
Nova Pazova was founded during Habsburg administration in 1791 in a marshy area and was populated by Evangelical Protestant German (Danube Swabian) settlers. The settlement grew from 51 initial settlers – including folk from Benningen, Marbach am Neckar, Schopfheim, Schorndorf, and Tübingen, in the Palatinate and Hesse, as well as Maglić in the Bačka.

Initially, the settlement was part of the Habsburg Military Frontier and the early German settlers had to serve in the Militärgrenze Wachdienst (military border watch guard) for the first few decades in the territory. In 1848-1849, the settlement was part of autonomous Serbian Vojvodina, but was again incorporated into the Military Frontier in 1849. After the abolishment of the Frontier, in 1882, the settlement was included into Syrmia County of Croatia-Slavonia, which was an autonomous kingdom within Habsburg Kingdom of Hungary and Austria-Hungary. According to 1910 census, majority of the settlement inhabitants spoke the German language.

In 1918, the settlement firstly became part of the State of Slovenes, Croats and Serbs, then part of the Kingdom of Serbia and finally part of the Kingdom of Serbs, Croats and Slovenes (later renamed to Yugoslavia). From 1918 to 1922, the settlement was part of the Syrmia County, from 1922 to 1929 part of the Syrmia Oblast, and from 1929 to 1941 part of the Danube Banovina.

From 1941 to 1944 the settlement was under Axis occupation and was attached to the Vuka County of the Independent State of Croatia. By 1944, there were over 6,000 residents, mostly Danube Swabian farmers and their Serb laborers. On 6 October 1944, the German-speaking inhabitants fled before the advancing Soviet army on a massive horse trek to Upper Austria.

Since 1944, the settlement was part of Yugoslav Vojvodina, which (from 1945) was part of new socialist Serbia within Yugoslavia. After the war (since 1945), the settlement was populated by new (mostly Serb) settlers, who originated from Bosnia and Herzegovina, Croatia and other parts of Serbia. Population censuses that were conducted after World War II recorded a Serb ethnic majority in Nova Pazova. From a population of 4,604 in 1948, the settlement was enlarged to 17,105 inhabitants in 2011.

Historical population
1948: 4,604
1953: 6,082
1961: 10,990
1971: 10,658
1981: 15,488
1991: 16,016
2002: 18,214
2011: 17,105

Notable residents
 Josias Kumpf (1925–2009), Nazi concentration camp guard

See also
Artistic Society Mladost Nova Pazova
List of places in Serbia
List of cities, towns and villages in Vojvodina

References

Slobodan Ćurčić, Broj stanovnika Vojvodine, Novi Sad, 1996.

External links 

Sremski Oglasi

Populated places in Srem District
Populated places in Syrmia
Stara Pazova